The Euskal Antzara is a traditional Spanish breed of domestic goose. It originates in the historical Basque Country. It is the only recognised goose breed of that area, and one of two Spanish breeds of goose, the other being the Oca Empurdanesa. It is distributed mainly in the comarca of Enkarterri in the province of Bizkaia, particularly in the areas of Abanto, Balmaseda, Güeñes, Karrantza and Zalla.

History 

The Euskal Antzara is the traditional goose breed of the Basque Country; there is little documentation of its history. It was kept in limited numbers to supply meat and eggs. 

In 2007 it was added to the Ark of Taste of the Slow Food Foundation.

Use 

The Euskal Antzara is reared principally for its eggs, and also for meat. The eggs are white, and weigh at least .

References

Goose breeds
Basque domestic animal breeds